Agon  is a newspaper published in Albania and based in Tirana. The paper was launched in 2007 as a free daily, being the first in its category.

References

2007 establishments in Albania
Publications established in 2007
Albanian-language newspapers
Newspapers published in Albania
Free newspapers
Mass media in Tirana